Wahab Dosunmu (14 May 1939 – 9 June 2013) was a Nigerian politician, he was minister of works and housing in the Second Nigerian Republic. He was a member of the Nigerian senate from 1999 to 2003. Dosunmu contested the Lagos governorship primaries in 1999 but lost to Senator Bola Tinubu. He won the seat for the Lagos West Senatorial District on the platform of Alliance for Democracy (AD). Later, he defected with some other AD federal lawmakers to the Peoples Democratic Party (PDP).

Dosunmu remained a vibrant member of the Senate where he was Chairman, Senate Committee on Science and Technology till 2003. He later defected to the People's Democratic Party from his prior party, the Alliance for Democracy. 
During the 1990s, he was prominent in the struggle to enthrone the presumed winner of the June 12 presidential election of 1993, MKO Abiola. He was High Commissioner to Malaysia between 2004 and 2007. He died on 9 June 2013 , in United States of America at 74.

Political Activist 
Dr Wahab Dosunmu, was a political activist and a chieftain of the National Democratic Coalition (NADECO)

The late politician was one of those who fought for the actualization of the June 12, 1993 presidential mandate of late Chief M.K.O Abiola through NADECO.

References

 "Tinubu, Others Go For Credibility Test", P.M. News, December 18, 1998

Living people
Alliance for Democracy (Nigeria) politicians
Peoples Democratic Party members of the Senate (Nigeria)
Year of birth missing (living people)